Joseph Lyle Talbot (born July 11, 1990) is an American filmmaker. His debut feature film, The Last Black Man in San Francisco (2019), which he co-wrote and directed, won the Best Director prize at the 2019 Sundance Film Festival. The film is loosely based on the life of his childhood best friend, Jimmie Fails.

Early life
Talbot grew up around Precita Park in Bernal Heights, near the Mission District in San Francisco. His father is the journalist David Talbot and his grandfather was the actor Lyle Talbot. He and his older brother, Nat Talbot, attended Ruth Asawa San Francisco School of the Arts, although Joe later dropped out. He met Jimmie Fails at a neighborhood park and they became close friends. Last Stop Livermore, a short film he made with Fails and Nat in high school, was a finalist in the Golden Gate Award.

Career

Short films
Talbot's debut film was the 2017 short film American Paradise, which he wrote, produced, and edited. It premiered at the 2017 Sundance Film Festival while nominated for the Short Film Grand Jury Prize and the Short Film Jury Award. American Paradise won the Best U.S. Short at the 2017 Nashville Film Festival.

Longshot Features and Last Black Man in San Francisco
In 2019, Talbot formed a production company called Longshot Features with Fails. Like American Paradise, The Last Black Man in San Francisco premiered at the 2019 Sundance Film Festival where Talbot won the best director at the festival and went on to win nine awards throughout the US Film Festivals.

Filmography

Feature films

Short films

Personal life
Talbot is the son of journalist/activist David Talbot, grandson of American actor Lyle Talbot, and nephew of New Yorker columnist Margaret Talbot.

References

External links

American film directors
Living people
1990 births
People from San Francisco
Sundance Film Festival award winners